Pauni Municipal Council is a Municipality body administrating Pauni City in Bhandara district of Maharashtra, 
India.

History
Pauni constituted as Municipal Council in 1867.

References

Municipal councils in Maharashtra
Bhandara district